A sexual system is a pattern of sex allocation or a distribution of male and female function across organisms in a species.  Terms like reproductive system and mating system have also been used as synonyms.

The distinction between sexual systems is not always clear due to phenotypic plasticity. Sexual systems are viewed as a key factor for genetic variation and reproductive success, and may have also led to the origin or extinction of certain species.

Interests in sexual systems go back to Darwin, who found that barnacles contain species that are androdioecious and some that are dioecious.

Types of sexual systems 
In plants there are monomorphic sexual systems where a species has hermaphrodite, male and/or female flowers on the same plant. Monomorphic sexual systems include monoecy, gynomonoecy, andromonoecy and trimonoecy. There are also dimorphic sexual systems like dioecy, gynodioecy and androdioecy.

Mixed sexual systems are where hermaphrodites coexist with single sexed individuals. This includes androdioecy, gynodioecy, and trioecy.

List of sexual systems

A

Androdioecy 
Androdioecy is a sexual system in which males and hermaphrodites coexist in a population. It is rare in both plants and animals.

Andromonoecy 
Andromonoecy is a rare sexual system in angiosperms, in which a plant has both male and hermaphroditic flowers. It has been a subject of interest regarding the mechanism of sex expression.

D

Dioicy 
Dioicy is one of the two main sexual systems in bryophytes. In dioicy male and female sex organs are on separate gametophytes.

Dioecy 

Dioecy is a sexual system in which a species has distinct individual organisms that are either male or female, i.e., they produce only male or only female gametes, either directly (in animals) or indirectly (in plants).

G

Gonochorism 
Gonochorism is a sexual system where individuals are either male or female. 
The term "gonochorism" is usually applied to animals while "dioecy" is applied to plants. Gonochorism is the most common sexual system in animals, occurring in 95% of animal species.

Gynodioecy 
Gynodioecy is a sexual system in which females and hermaphrodites coexist in the same population.

Gynomonoecy 
Gynomonoecy is defined as the presence of both female and hermaphrodite flowers on the same individual of a plant species. It is prevalent in Asteraceae but is poorly understood.

Gynodioecy-Gynomonoecy 
Gynodioecy-Gynomonoecy is a sexual system for plants when female, hermaphrodite, and gynomonoecious plants coexist in the same population.

M

Monoicy 
Monoicy is one of the two main sexual systems in bryophytes. In monoicy male and female sex organs are present in the same  gametophyte.

Monoecy 
Monoecy is a sexual system in which male and female flowers are present on the same plant. It is common in angiosperms, and occurs in 10% of all plant species.

S

Sequential hermaphroditism 
In sequential hermaphroditism individuals start their adult lives as one sex, and change to the other sex at a later age.

Sequential monoecy 
Sequential monoecy is a considered a confusing sexual system. Sequential monoecy can be difficult to differentiate from dioecy.

Simultaneous hermaphroditism 
Simultaneous hermaphroditism is a sexual system where an individual can produce both gamete types in the same breeding season. Simultaneous hermaphroditism is one of the most common sexual systems in animals (though far less common than gonochorism) and is one of the most stable.

Synoecy 
Synoecy is a sexual system in which all individuals in a population of flowering plants bear solely hermaphrodite flowers.

T

Trioecy 
Trioecy is a sexual system where males, females, and hermaphrodites exist in the same population. It is present in both plants and animals but is always extremely rare. Trioecy occurs in about 3.6% of flowering plants.

Trimonoecy 
Trimonoecy (also called androgynomonoecy) is when male, female, and hermaphrodite flowers are present on the same plant. Triomonoecy is rare.

References 

Sex
Reproduction
Developmental biology
Sexual system
Evolutionary biology
Taxonomy (biology)